Arkansas Times, a weekly alternative newspaper based in Little Rock, Arkansas, is a publication that has circulated more than 40 years, originally as a magazine.

Founded as a small magazine on newsprint in 1977 by publisher Alan Leveritt, it later became a glossy monthly magazine with paid circulation, and in May 1992 became a weekly tabloid-format publication on newsprint with free distribution. As of 2019, the Times is once again a glossy monthly magazine.

Its current format stems from reaction to the Arkansas Democrat buyout of assets from Gannett's closure of the Arkansas Gazette in 1991, which had resulted in the Arkansas Democrat-Gazette. The Arkansas Timess senior editor Max Brantley is among those former Gazette staffers who lost their jobs as a result of the merger. Brantley was the first editor of the weekly edition in May 1992. The Gazette'''s editorial cartoonist George Fisher became the Times cartoonist until his death.

Billed on its nameplate as Arkansas's weekly newspaper of politics and culture (similarly styled as other regional publications like The Memphis Flyer), Arkansas Times is noted for its opinion columnists and feature articles that take a decidedly progressive stance in comparison to the larger, daily Democrat-Gazette.

Over the years since its founding, the publication's parent company — Arkansas Times Limited Partnership — has gone on to produce a number of special inserts and associated publications. Among these are the weekly El Latino, a Spanish-language weekly. The company also publishes Savvy Kids, a family magazine; the quarterly Arkansas Wild about outdoor pursuits and Arkansas Food and Farm, a periodical that reports on small farm agriculture and locally sourced foods. Annually, the first Times issue of the new year is the 'Native's Guide to Pulaski County' — a comprehensive guide to communities and services in Little Rock and throughout Arkansas's most populous county.

The Times was an early innovator in Arkansas as a source of online news. Its Arkansas Blog began as a source of breaking news and analysis about Arkansas in October 2004. It records some 300,000 unique visitors monthly and also attracts readers through Facebook and Twitter posts. Unlimited access to the Arkansas Blog in 2013 became a subscription offering.

Lindsey Millar became editor of the Times in 2011. He introduced a number of digital features, including a weekly public affairs podcast and a daily video headline program. He has expanded the newspaper's reporting reach by privately underwritten reporting projects on a major oil pipeline spill and an ongoing project on education in Arkansas.

In 2018, the Times refused to sign a pledge not to boycott Israel as required by the State's anti-BDS law, Act 710. Consequently one of its advertisers, University of Arkansas – Pulaski Technical College, refused to renew its contract with the magazine. The Times in response sued the State in a case known as Arkansas Times LP v. Mark Waldrip'' claiming that its First Amendment rights had been violated. The case which is at the United States Court of Appeals for the Eighth Circuit is seen as principally important as it could set a precedent for the application of other anti-BDS laws. On June 22, 2022 the United States Court of Appeals for the Eighth Circuit issued its decision holding that the law was constitutional and did not violate the First Amendment as it was  intended to serve a “purely commercial purposes."

Logo
The icon used at the close of most articles and columns throughout the publication is the stylized face of a catfish. A larger version appears with a top hat and monocle at the top of the "Observer" column, typically found on Page 5 each week. The catfish is also seen in the newspaper's sign outside its building at Markham and Scott Streets in downtown Little Rock.

See also

 List of newspapers in Arkansas

References

Further reading

External links
 Arkansas Times official website
 Encyclopedia of Arkansas History & Culture entry

Alternative weekly newspapers published in the United States
Newspapers published in Arkansas
Newspapers established in 1978
1978 establishments in Arkansas